Arthur John Sharood (9 August 1856 – 31 March 1895) was an English cricketer.  Sharood was a right-handed batsman who bowled right-arm fast-medium.  He was born at Hurstpierpoint, Sussex, and was educated at Hurstpierpoint College.

Sharood made a single first-class appearance for Sussex against Surrey at the County Ground, Hove, in 1879.  He took two wickets, both in Surrey's first-innings, dismissing John Shuter and Leonard Shuter and finishing with figures of 2/51 from 26 overs.  The match ended in a draw.  This was his only major appearance for Sussex.

He died at Axim in the British Gold Coast on 31 March 1895.

References

External links
Arthur Sharood at ESPNcricinfo
Arthur Sharood at CricketArchive

1856 births
1895 deaths
People from Hurstpierpoint
People educated at Hurstpierpoint College
English cricketers
Sussex cricketers